Elisha Abas (born 1971) is an Israeli pianist, composer and former professional football player.

Elisha Abas was a student of Israeli pianist and pedagogue Pnina Salzman and was mentored by Artur Rubinstein. Roma, national Italian newspaper, commented on a performance in Naples, Italy saying, "he is the most refined and interesting pianist of our generation … His "playing is the perfect marriage of exuberant musicality restrained with the right dose of rationalism that is rich with colors and shades. His palette shines in all his splendor with a captivating performance of Chopin and Schumann".

Life and career 

Abas was born into a musical family. He is the great-great-grandson of Russian composer, Alexander Scriabin (1872 – 1915), via Ariadna Scriabina (1905 – 22 July 1944), Gilbert-Elizabeth "Betty" Knut-Lazarus (1926 – 1964), and his mother Ariane Abas (1950 – ). His father is the Israeli children's author Shlomo Abas (1948 – ).

Abas was a child prodigy who started performing at the age of six and has since shared the stage with Isaac Stern, Leonard Bernstein and Zubin Mehta. Abas achieved many accolades throughout his career. Those most notable were achieved when he was a young prodigy – winning first place in the America Israel Cultural Foundation music competition for eight consecutive years and first place in the Claremont Piano Competition.

At age 14, he felt "burned out" as a musician, and retired from the field. He began pursuing a career as a professional football player. He played left back for several Israeli teams, first in Hapoel Petah Tikva under coach Avram Grant, then for Hapoel Kfar Saba and several other teams. As a result of an injury, he retired as a football player at the age of 28.

After retiring from football, Abas decided to try and return to playing piano. He contacted Salzman, and began performing again. Today he continues to perform throughout the world, most recently in North America, Europe, Cuba, Russia, Israel, and China. Elisha Abas is also a composer. He rarely performs his original compositions in public; however, in 2009, Elisha performed his original music in St. Petersburg's Smolny Cathedral, United Nations Assembly Hall, and in Teatro Amadeo Roldán in Havana, Cuba. In December 2009, Elisha Abas performed and recorded live the Brahms First Piano Concerto in Havana, Cuba with the National Symphony Orchestra of Cuba conducted by Yoel Gamzou. 
In 2010, he recorded and released a live recording of the Mozart Piano Concerto No. 23 K. 488 with the International Mahler Orchestra live in Berlin. He is the co-founder of the Concert Meister Series in New York City.

Elisha Abas currently resides in Irvington, NY.

References

External links
 

Living people
1971 births
Israeli classical pianists
Hapoel Petah Tikva F.C. players
Hapoel Kfar Saba F.C. players
Maccabi Ahi Nazareth F.C. players
Hapoel Rishon LeZion F.C. players
Hapoel Hadera F.C. players
Footballers from Jerusalem
Musicians from Jerusalem
Jewish classical pianists
Israeli people of Russian-Jewish descent
Israeli people of German-Jewish descent
Israeli people of French-Jewish descent
Israeli people of American-Jewish descent
Association football fullbacks
Israeli footballers
Composers from Jerusalem